The Puppy is a fictional character in Lewis Carroll's 1865 novel Alice's Adventures in Wonderland. He appears in the chapter "The Rabbit Sends a Little Bill".

Role in the book
In the book, when Alice shrinks to a tiny size, and escapes into the White Rabbit's garden, she finds the Puppy (now apparently enormous to her, but actually a normal sized dog) and briefly plays with him, and compares it to "a game of play with a cart-horse, and expecting every moment to be trampled under his feet". At the conclusion of the game, she leaves him, with a slight regret of the necessity to do so.

Tim Burton version
In the 2010 film, the Puppy has become a bloodhound named Bayard: voiced by Timothy Spall and forced to hunt for Alice by the Knave of Hearts. Bayard tracks Alice to the tea party held by the Mad Hatter, March Hare, and Dormouse, where the Hatter hides her in a teapot and tells Bayard to lead the knights away, which he does. Some time afterwards, he finds Alice again under the Mad Hatter's hat, and takes her to the Red Queen's castle by Alice's own request, where she arranges to rescue the Mad Hatter from the Queen's captivity. After her failure there, Bayard leads Alice to the White Queen's castle, while she rides the Bandersnatch.

Bayard returns in the 2016 sequel, Alice Through the Looking Glass, again voiced by Spall. The young version of the character is voiced by Kyle Hebert.

References

Lewis Carroll characters
Dogs in literature
Literary characters introduced in 1865